The verziau of Gargantua (or vierzeux of Gargantua), also known as Haute-Borne, is a menhir at Bois-lès-Pargny in Aisne, France.

Description

This is a monolith of hard sandstone 4.35 meters high and 1.50 m wide.
This stone is chipped at the top, retains its base width to about half of its height, and tapers to its upper end, just over a meter wide

Location

The menhir is north of the town of Bois-lès-Pargny, a few meters from a small copse, near Sons-et-Ronchères.

History

At the beginning of the 19th century, the menhir had a twin sister, which was destroyed to extract a large amount of sandstone. It is claimed that the depth of the menhir below the ground is the same as its above-ground height, giving a total height of 9 meters. It is likely that this menhir came from the nearby forest of Berjaumont, where the blocks of sandstone are quite numerous. It must have been rolled onto this hill by a large number of men. Legend has it that a man of immense size was using it to sharpen his scythe, and left the rock on the site in a gesture of anger.

The monument was listed as a monument historique in 1889.

Appendices

See also 
Gargantua

References 

Archaeological sites in France
Neolithic France
Prehistoric sites in France
Megalithic monuments in France
Stone Age Europe
Buildings and structures in Aisne
Menhirs